Crow Lake is a lake in Stearns County, Minnesota.  Crow Lake lies at an elevation of 1260 feet (384 m).

References

Lakes of Minnesota
Lakes of Stearns County, Minnesota